Dimitra Korri (born July 17, 1992) is a Greek figure skater who represents Greece in ladies' singles. She is the 2021 Skate Helena bronze medalist, the 2018 EduSport Trophy silver medalist, the 2018 Balkan Games bronze medalist, and a six-time Greek national champion (2014, 2017, 2018, 2019, 2021, 2022).

Personal life 
Korri spent her childhood between Greece and the USA. She went to school in the United States and spent her summers in Greece. She speaks fluent Greek and English.

Career 
Korri began skating at the age of six and has been representing Greece internationally since the 2011–12 season. She won the Greek National Figure Skating Championships in 2014, 2017, 2018 and 2019. At the 2018 Greek National Figure Skating Championships she achieved an historic national record for the highest score ever posted at a Greek national championship.   Additionally, she holds two national silver medals from the 2011 and 2013 Greek National Championships as well as one national bronze medal from the 2012 Greek National Championships. She finished 9th at the 2013 U.S. International Figure Skating Classic. In March 2017, she won the silver medal at the 29th Coppa Europa in Italy. In January 2018, she won the senior international silver medal at the EduSport Trophy in Romania. She finished 4th at the 2018 Triglav Trophy and in March 2018 she earned a bronze medal at the Balkan Games. This was the first time since 1989 that a Greek female athlete had achieved a podium position at a Balkan Games.

Signature move 
Korri is known for executing a low one handed hydroblade in her skating programs.

CS: Challenger Series; JGP: Junior Grand Prix

Results

References

External links 
 

Greek female single skaters
1992 births
Living people
People from Chicago
Competitors at the 2017 Winter Universiade
Sportspeople from Chicago